Michael Williamson (born 1957) is an American photojournalist. He has won two Pulitzer Prizes.

Of the books he has made with writer Dale Maharidge while both men were on the staff of the Sacramento Bee, And Their Children After Them won the Pulitzer Prize for General Non-Fiction in 1990 and Journey to Nowhere: The Saga of the New Underclass  was credited by singer-songwriter Bruce Springsteen as an inspiration for two songs from his album The Ghost of Tom Joad, "Youngstown" and "The New Timer".

In 1993, Williamson became a staff photographer for The Washington Post. Photos he took on assignment in Kosovo, along with the work of Post colleagues Carol Guzy and Lucian Perkins, led to Williamson's share of another Pulitzer in 2000.

Orphaned at an early age, Williamson grew up in a series of foster homes, a circumstance to which he attributes his interest in the poor and the downtrodden.

Books with Dale Maharidge
And Their Children After Them (1989)
Journey to Nowhere: The Saga of the New Underclass
Re-released. 1995. With a foreword by Bruce Springsteen.
The Last Great American Hobo (1993)
Homeland
Denison, Iowa

References

1957 births
Living people
Pulitzer Prize for General Non-Fiction winners
Pulitzer Prize for Feature Photography winners
American photojournalists
20th-century American non-fiction writers
21st-century American non-fiction writers